Molochnoye is a rural locality (a selo) in Vologda, Vologda Oblast, Russia. The population was 7,690 as of 2017. There are 22 streets.

Geography 
Molochnoye is located on the left bank of the Vologda River, 15 km northwest of Vologda (the district's administrative centre) by road. Ilyinskoye is the nearest rural locality.

References 

Rural localities in Vologda Urban Okrug
Vologda Urban Okrug